The men's 100 metre freestyle competition at the 2014 South American Games took place on March 10 at the Estadio Nacional.  The last champion was Crox Acuña of Venezuela.

This race consisted of two lengths of the pool, both lengths being in freestyle.

Records
Prior to this competition, the existing world and Pan Pacific records were as follows:

Results
All times are in minutes and seconds.

Heats
The first round was held on March 10, at 12:10.

Final 
The final was held on March 10, at 20:39.

References

Swimming at the 2014 South American Games